Uhde is a surname. It may refer to:

  (born 1978), a German business journalist and manager
  (1807–1861), a German astronomer, mathematician and educator
  (born 1950), a German photographer
  (born 1948), a German Catholic theologian
  (1792–1856), a German merchant and collector
  (1836–1905), a German architect
  (born 1948), a German painter and performance designer
  (1880–1966), a German engineer and entrepreneur
 Fritz von Uhde (1848–1911), a German painter
  (born 1937), a German lawyer, dog handler and writer
 Hermann Uhde (1914–1965), a German bass-baritone
 Hermann Uhde-Bernays (1873–1965), a German Germanist and art historian
 Johann Otto Uhde (1725–1766), a German composer and violinist
 Jürgen Uhde (1913–1991), a German musicologist, pianist and educator
  (1813–1885), a German surgeon
 Milan Uhde (born 1936), a Czech playwright and politician
  (1929–2014), a German journalist and politician
 Wilhelm Uhde (1874–1947), a German art collector
  (1868–1917), a German writer, poet and composer

It may also refer to:
 , an engineering division of the German ThyssenKrupp

See also 
 
 Ude (disambiguation)